Don't Stop is the second studio album by Taiwanese singer Jolin Tsai. It was released on April 26, 2000, by Universal and D Sound. Produced by David Wu, Peter Lee, Paul Lee, and Chen Wei, it incorporated genres of pop, R&B, hip-hop, rock, and reggae. Her singing skills on the album were better than before, and her ballad performance became more emotional and delicate, while her dance song performance became more free and easy.

It was well received by music critics, who commented that the dance tracks, which were flush with positive vibe and cheerful disposition, set her off in a more dance-oriented direction. The album sold more than 500,000 copies in Taiwan, becoming the year's second highest-selling album by a female artist and the year's sixth highest-selling album overall in the country.

Background and development 
On September 10, 1999, Tsai released her debut studio album, 1019, which sold more than 450,000 copies in Taiwan. Around Christmas of 1999, Tsai flew to the Quad Studios in New York City to record songs "Don't Stop", "Are You Happy", and "Eternity" from her new album, and she also worked with American photographer John N. for the cover and artwork of the album.

Writing and recording 

"Don't Stop" is a Chinese version of S Club 7's "Bring It All Back," and the lyrics describe the young generation's fearless vision of dreams and attitude towards love. "Don't Stop", "Are You Happy", and "Eternity" were all recorded at the Quad Studios in New York City, and four of the black backing vocalists who had worked with Tsai on the album 1019 provided vocal harmony again for the three songs. "Sugar Sugar", which was originally sung by the Archies, sounds more hip-hop than the original version.

Release and promotion 
After more than 140,000 copies had been pre-ordered in Taiwan in the month before its release, Universal invited the representatives of all record stores in Taiwan to attend three album preview sessions starting on April 11, 2000. On April 16, 2000, Tsai held the Don't Stop Concert in Taichung, Taiwan. On April 22, 2000, Tsai held a signing session in Taipei, Taiwan. On June 1, 2000, Universal released the victory edition of the album in celebration of the album sales exceeding 400,000 copies in Taiwan. This edition was limited to 50,000 copies and additionally includes a photo book. On June 27, 2000, she flew to Singapore to promote the album. On July 1, 2000, she flew to Hong Kong to promote the album. On July 10, 2000, Jolin Tsai held the Examinee Night Concert in Taipei, Taiwan. On July 11, 2000, Universal released the celebration edition in celebration of the sales exceeding 450,000 copies in Taiwan. It was limited to 50,000 copies and additionally included three music videos and three live videos. The album reached number 10 and number 14 on the 2000 year-end album sales charts of Rose Records and Tachung Records in Taiwan, respectively.

Live performances 
On May 21, 2000, Tsai participated in the President and Vice President Inauguration Celebration Concert held by TVBS and performed "You Gotta Know". On June 4 , 2000, Tsai participated in the TVBS-G television show Super Live 3-5, where she performed "You Gotta Know" and "What Kind of Love". On July 9, 2000,  she participated in the TVBS-G television show Super Live 3-5, where she performed "Everything's Gonna Be Alright" and "What Kind of Love". Since then, Tsai has been performing songs from the album at various events.

Singles and music videos 
Tsai released a single for the album, "Don't Stop," which reached number 17 on the Hit FM Top 100 Singles of the Year chart of 2000. Both music videos of "Don't Stop" and "Are You Happy" were directed by Tony Lin, with Taiwanese actress Claire Chien appearing in the music video of the latter. The music video of "You Gotta Know" was directed by Kuang Sheng. The music video of "What Kind of Love" was directed by JP Huang, and it features Taiwanese actor Michael Chang. The music video of "Sugar Sugar" was directed by Showx2.

Artwork 
The cover of the album's standard edition is a headshot of Tsai, whose messy bangs and half-smiling facial expression show the innocence and immatureness of young girl.

Critical reception 
Tencent Entertainment's Shuwa commented: "Different from the first album, Jolin Tsai's second album changed the strategy of ballad as lead single and replaced with cheerful and lively dance song, but what's still the same is the expression of girls' feelings. So, no matter "Don't Stop", "You Gotta Know", or "Are You Happy", they all describe the emotions of young girls. In terms of songwriting, songwriters including Kuo Heng-chi, Jerry Huang, and Michael Tu contributed a lot of popularity to the album. Peter Lee, Paul Lee, and David Wu, who collaborated with Tsai on her first album, remained as producers of the album, and the first-time collaboration with Chen Wei on "You Gotta Know" also created a great spark. Although the album was added the elements of rock and reggae, the musical performance is relatively conservative, basically these songs were placed nearly last tracks on the album. There's no denying that pop is still the main style of the album."

Sina Music's Stephen Lee commented: "Jolin Tsai's first album 1019 is a more R&B album, this time Don't Stop almost has no R&B, which replaced with typical Taiwan's mainstream pop music. It seems the label hasn't made up its mind yet. Recently, I read a news said that Jolin Tsai would go to Japan to be the junior fellow of Hikaru Utada, wouldn't that just bring her back to R&B? We'll see then. So far, Don't Stop is still pretty good, though it's simple, but it's kind of interesting among mainstream albums, her singing skills can still be heard quite strong, her future is very promising."

Sohu Music commented: "Her dance songs are full of positive vibe, and her lyrical songs are charming enough, met all the criteria of young female singers to become popular, so it's not surprising that she broke out of the crowd of new artists at the end of the century."

Accolades 
The song "Don't Stop" won a China Music Award for Top Songs and a Top Chinese Music Award for Best Dance Song (Hong Kong/Taiwan).

Track listing

Release history

References

External links 
 
 

2000 albums
Jolin Tsai albums
Universal Music Taiwan albums